The 1936 Ole Miss Rebels football team was an American football team that represented the University of Mississippi in the Southeastern Conference during the 1936 college football season. In its seventh season under head coach Ed Walker, the team compiled a 5–5–2 record (0–3–1 against conference opponents).  The team played its home games at Vaught–Hemingway Stadium in Oxford, Mississippi.

The team beat the Miami Hurricanes and tied Tennessee.

Schedule

Roster
E Buster Poole, Sr. Dave Bernard Halfback

References

Ole Miss
Ole Miss Rebels football seasons
Ole Miss Rebels football